William Joseph Maher II is the current director of athletics for Canisius College. He previously served as interim athletics director of the University at Buffalo from 2003 to 2005. Maher played football at Canisius from 1985–1989, graduating in 1989 with a degree in physical education.

References

External links
Canisius Golden Griffins bio

Year of birth missing (living people)
Living people
Buffalo Bulls athletic directors
Canisius Golden Griffins athletic directors
Canisius Golden Griffins football players